BASA-press was a newsagency from the Republic of Moldova. Founded in November 1992, Moldova's oldest independent newsagency ceased its activity in December 2009.

History
BASA press was founded by a group of five journalists (including Vasile Botnaru) in Chişinău on 5 November 1992. The newsagency was the first independent news agency in the Republic of Moldova. Infotag was the second one, operating officially since 1 December  1993. BASA-press covered the entire range of political, social, economic, business and other events.

On 31 December 2009, BASA-press, Moldova's oldest independent news agency closed down. Agency's ex-director Sergiu Ipati told the agency had been closed down because of the ongoing crisis. In 2009, the Moldovan information market lost another news agency - Flux, which was controlled by the Christian-Democratic People's Party (Moldova).

References

External links
 Moldova's oldest independent news agency closed down
 BASA press
 Agenţia BASA-press, închisă din cauza crizei financiare
 BASA-press, închisă din cauza crizei

Publishing companies established in 1992
2009 disestablishments in Moldova
History of Moldova since 1991
News agencies based in Moldova
Cultural history of Moldova